Jon Sallinen (born 13 November, 2000) is a Finnish freestyle skier who competed in the 2022 Winter Olympics in the men's halfpipe event.

Career 
Sallinen was unable to advance in the 2022 Winter Olympics men's halfpipe qualifying round, finishing in last place.

During his attempt to qualify, Sallinen crashed into an unidentified cameraman. Both Sallinen and the cameraman avoided serious injury. Sallinen subsequently apologized, stating "I hope the camera guy is all good, sorry."

References 

2000 births
Living people
Freestyle skiers at the 2022 Winter Olympics
Olympic freestyle skiers of Finland
Finnish male freestyle skiers
Sportspeople from Helsinki
X Games athletes